Poya Bridge is a cable-stayed bridge in Fribourg, Switzerland.

Planning and construction

Numerous studies have been made since 1959 for a new crossing of the Sarine River in Fribourg. In 1989, the local government invited five engineering firms to submit concept proposals for a new crossing. Plans for the new bridge were crafted in the 1990s and 2000s. The 25,000 vehicles per day took a significant toll on quality of life in the neighborhood and were degrading the Fribourg Cathedral, a symbol of the city.

In June 2006, the Grand Council of Fribourg approved the project and scheduled a public vote to approve financing of the project. Three months later, financing of the Poya Bridge was approved by 81% of Fribourg voters. The contractor was a consortium of Implenia Construction SA, Grisoni-Zaugg SA et Routes Modernes SA.

Work began on 31 October 2008 and the bridge opened to vehicular traffic on 12 October 2014. The bridge cost 211 million Swiss francs. Upon opening, the Zaehringen Bridge was closed to most motor vehicles and now serves only emergency vehicles, public transportation buses, motorized scooters, cyclists, and pedestrians.

Characteristics

The two pylons support a  cable-stayed span. The remainder of the bridge is supported by ten piers. A cover on the northwest  of the bridge leading to the tunnel entrance was added to reduce noise in the adjacent Palatinat quarter.

The bridge deck carries three lanes of traffic—two leading towards the town center and one away from the town center—and a shared path for pedestrians and cyclists. The bridge deck is inclined; the southeast end is approximately  higher than the northwest end. The bridge deck is flanked by  barriers to prevent suicide attempts.

The northwest end of the bridge leads directly into a cut-and-cover tunnel, known as the  Poya Tunnel and built at the same time as the bridge at a cost of 28 million francs. The tunnel travels beneath the Berne-Fribourg rail line and Palatinat Park. The pedestrian and cycling path diverges from the bridge and leads to the Bellevue and Palatinat quarters without entering the tunnel. The tunnel from the bridge intersects a short subterranean segment of Rue de Morat. The intersection is an underground roundabout around a cone-shaped column.

The speed limit is 60 km/h on the bridge and 50 km/h in the tunnel.

Notes

References

External links

Transport in Fribourg
Cable-stayed bridges in Switzerland
Road bridges in Switzerland
Bridges completed in 2014
21st-century architecture in Switzerland